2175 Andrea Doria, provisional designation , is a stony Florian asteroid from the inner regions of the asteroid belt, approximately 4 kilometers in diameter.

It was discovered on 12 October 1977, by Swiss astronomer Paul Wild at Zimmerwald Observatory near Bern, Switzerland, and named after 16th-century Genoese admiral Andrea Doria.

Orbit and classification 

Andrea Doria is a member of the Flora family, one of the largest families of stony asteroids in the main belt. It orbits the Sun in the inner main-belt at a distance of 1.8–2.7 AU once every 3 years and 4 months (1,205 days). Its orbit has an eccentricity of 0.21 and an inclination of 4° with respect to the ecliptic. A first precovery was taken at Palomar Observatory in 1950, extending the body's observation arc by 27 years prior to its official discovery observation at Zimmerwald.

Physical characteristics 

In October 2010, a rotational lightcurve of Andrea Doria was obtained from photometric observations by American amateur astronomer Ralph Megna. Lightcurve analysis gave a well-defined rotation period of 4.880 hours with a brightness variation of 0.25 magnitude.

According to the survey carried out by NASA's Wide-field Infrared Survey Explorer with its subsequent NEOWISE mission, Andrea Doria measures between 3.86 and 4.013 kilometers in diameter and its surface has an albedo between 0.392 and 0.417. The Collaborative Asteroid Lightcurve Link assumes an albedo of 0.24 – derived from 8 Flora, a S-type asteroid and the family's largest member and namesake – and calculates a diameter of 4.50 kilometers with an absolute magnitude of 13.9.

Naming 

This minor planet was named after Genoese admiral Andrea Doria (1466–1560), popularized in Friedrich Schiller's drama Fiesco. Several ships, including the SS Andrea Doria, famous for its sinking off the coast of New England, had also been named after the admiral. The official naming citation was published by the Minor Planet Center on 22 September 1983.

Notes

References

External links 
 MacAstronomy.com, homepage of Ralph Megna
 Asteroid Lightcurve Database (LCDB), query form (info )
 Dictionary of Minor Planet Names, Google books
 Asteroids and comets rotation curves, CdR – Observatoire de Genève, Raoul Behrend
 Discovery Circumstances: Numbered Minor Planets (1)-(5000) – Minor Planet Center
 
 

002175
Discoveries by Paul Wild (Swiss astronomer)
Named minor planets
19771012